La Liga all-time top scorer is Lionel Messi with 474 goals, all for Barcelona. He also holds the record for most goals scored in a single season with 50 in the 2011–12 campaign, and is the only player ever to win the league's top scorer award in eight different seasons. Athletic Bilbao's Telmo Zarra, who was the competition's all-time top scorer until 2014, won the top scorer award six times. Three other players — Real Madrid's Alfredo Di Stéfano, Quini of Sporting Gijón and Barcelona, and Hugo Sánchez of Atlético Madrid and Real Madrid — each finished as top scorer in five individual seasons.

All-time top scorers

Key
 Bold shows players still playing in La Liga.
 Italics show players still playing professional football in other leagues.

Top scorers by season

See also
Pichichi Trophy
European Golden Shoe
Premier League Golden Boot
List of Bundesliga top scorers by season
List of Ligue 1 top scorers
Capocannoniere

References 
Notes

Citations
 Liga de Fútbol Profesional historical archive
 
 Martínez Calatrava, Vicente (2002). Historia y estadística del fúbol español. De la Olimpiada de Amberes a la Guerra Civil (1920–1939). 
 Martínez Calatrava, Vicente (2002). Historia y estadística del fútbol español. De la Guerra Civil al Mundial de Brasil (1939–1950).   
 Martínez Calatrava, Vicente (2002). Historia y estadística del fútbol español. Del gol de Zarra al gol de Marcelino (1950–1964). 
 Martínez Calatrava, Vicente (2002). Historia y estadística del fútbol español. Del Campeonato de Europa al Mundial de España (1964–1982). 
 Martínez Calatrava, Vicente (2002). Historia y estadística del fútbol español. Del Mundial 82 a la final española de París (1982–2001)

External links 
 LFP - Historical squads for every season of the league including official goal scoring stats
 Top 10 La Liga Golden Boot winners
 Top 10 Highest Goalscorers in La Liga History

 
La Liga records and statistics
La Liga trophies and awards
Spain
Spain
Association football player non-biographical articles